Thomas Bertram Lonsdale Webster  (3 July 1905 – 31 May 1974) was a British archaeologist and Classicist, known for his studies of Greek comedy.

Background
He was the son of Sir Thomas Lonsdale Webster. During World War I he attended Charterhouse. As a student at Oxford University, he first studied Greek vases that John Beazley had brought in, but soon switched to Menander and developed a lifelong interest in Greek comedy that resulted in "reconstructions of the plots of lost plays and ... collections of evidence from widely disparate sources bearing on the history of the Greek theater".

Career
He followed William Moir Calder (1880–1960) as Hulme Professor of Greek at Manchester University, a position he held 1931–48, when he was followed by H. D. (Henry) Westlake (1906–92). He then was Professor of Greek at University College London 1948–68 and in 1953 established the Institute of Classical Studies. During World War II he served as an officer in the military intelligence. After his wife, the Classicist A. M. Dale, died in 1967, he moved to Stanford University as professor of classics and as an emeritus.

Awards and honours
President of the Joint Association of Classical Teachers
President of the Hellenic Society and the Classical Association
Honorary Doctor of Letters at University of Manchester 1966 (also at Trinity College, Dublin)
Fellowships of the Royal Academy and the Society of Antiquaries of London
In honour of his work, a street in the Acropolis district of Athens has been renamed to Webster Street (transliterated Gouemster on some signs and maps).

Publications

External links

References

English archaeologists
Scholars of ancient Greek history
People educated at Charterhouse School
Alumni of Christ Church, Oxford
Academics of the University of Manchester
Academics of University College London
Stanford University Department of Classics faculty
1905 births
1974 deaths
Manchester Literary and Philosophical Society